Parkland Beach is a hamlet in the Canadian province of Saskatchewan.

Demographics 

References

Designated places in Saskatchewan
Mervin No. 499, Saskatchewan
Organized hamlets in Saskatchewan
Division No. 17, Saskatchewan